Three Men and a Baby is a collaborative studio album by Mike Kunka and American rock band Melvins, released on April 1, 2016 through Sub Pop. The album was mostly recorded in 1999 by Tim Green, but further production was delayed for over a decade. It was finished in 2015 with longtime Melvins associate Toshi Kasai engineering and mixing.

Track listing
All songs written by Mike Kunka and the Melvins except where noted.

Personnel
Dale Crover – drums, vocals; photos
Buzz Osborne – guitar, bass, vocals; photos
Kevin Rutmanis – bass, vocals
Mike Kunka – bass, vocals

Production
Tim Green – engineer
Toshi Kasai – engineer, mixing
John Golden – mastering
Mackie Osborne – art

References

Melvins albums
Mike Kunka albums
2016 albums
Sub Pop albums